Damrosch is a surname.

Damrosch may also refer to:
 Damrosch (horse), American racehorse
 Damrosch Opera Company (1894–1900), American opera company founded by Walter Damrosch
 Damrosch Park at Lincoln Center, New York City, named after the Damrosch family